Gold is a compilation album from the Irish band The Cranberries, released as part of Universal Music's Gold series. Unlike on the preceding compilation Stars: The Best of 1992–2002, the versions of the songs present on this two-disc collection are not edited for length.

The liner notes indicate on page six that the album was originally going to feature a 16th track on disc two, taken from Dolores O'Riordan's solo album Are You Listening?.

Track listing
Disc 1

Disc 2

Charts

References 

The Cranberries compilation albums
Albums produced by Stephen Street
Albums produced by Bruce Fairbairn
2008 greatest hits albums
Cranberries
Island Records compilation albums